Fanis Mouratidis is a Greek actor.

Biography 

Fanis Mouratidis was born in Thessaloniki, Greece. Even though he was accepted in several Greek university schools, he chose to study adcting and finally graduated from the drama school of National Theatre of Northern Greece (NTNG).

He moved to Athens after being encouraged to do so by theatre director Kostas Tsianos. He first appeared on stage in 1992 in Fioro tou Levante which was staged by NTNG and directed by Vaggelis Theodoropoulos. His first cinema appearance was in Gamilia Narki directed by Dimitris Indores. He first appeared on TV in Etsi Ksafnika, a series written by Mirella Papaoikonomou in 2004. He has appeared in multiple successful TV series, films and theatre plays. He plays in Maestro, a Greek TV series written and directed by Christophoros Papakaliatis - Maestro is the first series written and played in greek language that Netflix bought.

He loves to travel. He is married to Greek actress, Anna - Maria Papaharalampous since 2008 and they have two sons.

Filmography
2003: Gamilia Narki (film) (International English Title: Totally Married)
2004: Etsi Ksafnika (TV Series)
2005:  To kokkino domatio (TV Series, as Stratos; 1 episode: Mia nihta stin Athina)
2005: Epafi (TV Series)
2006: Pente lepta akomi (as Konstantinos, a.k.a. Extended Play)
2006: Fige esi, ela esi (TV series) 
2006: Ellie Labeti: I teleftaia parastasi (as Giannis Mavros/Kostas Karras)
2007-2008: Baba min treheis (TV series) (as Vassilis)
2008: Bank Bang (film)
2009: Pethaino gia sena (film)
2010-2011: M+M (as Michalis)
2011: Kliniki Periptosi (TV series) (only for one episode)
2015: Amore Mio
2018-2020: Peta Ti Friteza (TV series) (as Kimon Orloff)
2022: Maestro (mini TV series) (as Fanis)

References

External links
 

Greek male film actors
Living people
Actors from Thessaloniki
1970 births